Street Time is an American drama television series created by Richard Stratton. The series stars Rob Morrow, Michelle Nolden, Alexander Conti, Scott Cohen, Erika Alexander and Christopher Bolton. The series aired on Showtime for two seasons from June 23, 2002, to October 29, 2003.

Cast
Rob Morrow as Kevin Hunter 
Michelle Nolden as Rachel Goldstein 
Alexander Conti as Timmy Liberti 
Scott Cohen as James Liberti 
Erika Alexander as Dee Mulhern 
Christopher Bolton as Peter Hunter 
Kate Greenhouse as Karen Liberti 
Allegra Fulton as Ann Valentine 
Simon Reynolds as Steve Goldstein 
Jack Knight as Sean Hunter 
Terrence Howard as Lucius Mosley 
Jeffrey James as James Liberti Jr. 
Rod Wilson as Joe Ennis
Jeff Pustil as Gene 
Kathryn Zenna as Pia
Robert Smith as Ron Skouras 
Gail Maurice as Skye Nighthawk 
Craig Eldridge as Chase MacPherson 
Richard Chevolleau as Adonis 
Don Francks as Mr. Goldstein 
Shant Srabian as Saad 
Juan Carlos Velis as Gusano Guzman 
Patricia Gage as Mary Hunter
Polly Shannon as Danielle
Red Buttons as Sam Kahan
Keith Carradine as Frank Dugan
Billy Dee Williams as Charles White
Saul Williams as Greg Cooper
Rick Fox as Peter Samson
Giancarlo Esposito as Jesse Haslim
Judd Hirsch as Shimi Goldman
Daniel Dae Kim as Vo Nguyen
Serena Williams as Meeka Hayes

Series overview

Episodes

Season 1 (2002–03)

Season 2 (2003)

References

External links
 

2002 American television series debuts
2003 American television series endings
2000s American crime drama television series
American action television series
English-language television shows
Showtime (TV network) original programming
Television series by Sony Pictures Television